Mohammad Samer al-Khalil (born 1977) is a Syrian politician. He is currently serving as Economy and Foreign Trade Minister.

Career
He served in the Imad Khamis government, the First Hussein Arnous government and the Second Hussein Arnous government.

He attended Expo 2020 and signed a trade deal with Emirati economy minister Abdulla bin Touq Al Marri.

References 

Living people
1977 births
21st-century Syrian politicians
Syrian ministers of economy
Damascus University alumni